Santa Elena is a small town located on the left side of the Parana River, in the North of Entre Rios, Argentina.

It has beautiful beaches and it is also one of the best places to go fishing in Entre Rios, in fact, Santa Elena is known as “The Fishing Paradise”. 

Every year, a fishing contest takes place by the month of November, which is called Fiesta Provincial del Armado Entrerriano. 

Santa Elena is an excellent place if you are looking for fun, peace, and natural environments.

There are a bunch of outdoor activities to practice there such as can kayak rowing, sandbanks arriving, eco trekking, horse riding, or cycling tours.

Regarding celebrations, in January, visitors can enjoy the music of regional artists on the festival "Provincial de la Chamarrita" as well as the "Carnivals" which are considered one of the most important in the Litoral.

On this occasion, there is a display of dancers, magnificent costumes and the rhythm of the comparsas.

Santa Elena offers historical places to visit like The Regional Museum, The English Neighborhood, The Factory, and The Old Catholic church.

Come and feel free within nature.

Notable people 
 Wilfredo Caballero, professional football goalkeeper was born in Santa Elena.

References
 
 Santa Elena at TurismoEntreRios.com.
 Port of Santa Elena (historical, disabled) at Historia y Arqueología Marítima.

Populated places in Entre Ríos Province
Paraná River